Golden Record may refer to:

 The Voyager Golden Records, included aboard the Voyager spacecraft by NASA
 The Golden Record, album by the singer Little Scream
 Golden Record (album), album by The Dangerous Summer
 Golden Records, a defunct record label
 Golden record (informatics), or golden copy, an alternative name for the master version of a record in a single source of truth system

See also
 Gold Record (disambiguation)